An Gàidheal Ùr was a 12-page monthly newspaper published in Scottish Gaelic. The name means New Gael in a play on an older magazine publication called An Gàidheal. People usually received the paper as a supplement in the West Highland Free Press or by subscription. It ceased publication in 2009 after funding and advertising from Bòrd na Gàidhlig ended.

Content
It generally carried Scottish Gaelic or Highland related content such as stories about new developments of the language, crofting, ferry services, media stories, cultural events and sport.

It also had various opinion columns and regularly carried job advertisements of Gaelic related jobs.

Writing for the paper, Aonghas Phàdraig Caimbeul was awarded Gaelic journalist of the year at the 2007 Scottish Press Awards.

See also
List of newspapers in Scotland

References

Newspapers published in Scotland
Newspapers with Scottish Gaelic content
1998 establishments in Scotland
2009 disestablishments in Scotland
Newspapers established in 1998
Publications disestablished in 2009